Ryan Patrick Daly (born January 6, 1998) is an American basketball player who last played for the Agua Caliente Clippers of the NBA G League. He played college basketball for the Delaware Blue Hens and the Saint Joseph's Hawks.

Early life and high school career
Ryan Daly helped the St. Denis Bulldawgs win the Region 32 Championship in 2010. Daly played for Archbishop John Carroll High School in Radnor, Pennsylvania, where he was teammates with future NBA player Derrick Jones Jr. In his junior season, he averaged 12.8 points per game, helping his team reach the Class AAA state title game. As a senior, Daly averaged 21.7 points and seven rebounds per game, making 65 three-pointers and leading his team to second place in the Philadelphia Catholic League. Daly was named Catholic League Most Valuable Player, Markward Club City Player of the Year, while earning Class AAA All-State First Team honors. He had originally committed to play college basketball for Hartford but never officially signed with the program. Daly switched his commitment to Delaware after Archbishop Carroll alum Martin Ingelsby was hired as its head coach.

College career

Delaware
On January 7, 2017, Daly scored a freshman season-high 28 points for Delaware in a 91–81 loss to UNC Wilmington. He made a game-winning three-pointer with 12 seconds left, while recording 24 points and 12 rebounds, in a 68–67 victory over Drexel on February 16, 2017. He registered six double-doubles and set school freshman records for points and rebounds. Daly was named Colonial Athletic Association (CAA) Rookie of the Year, winning CAA Rookie of the Week six times, and earned Third Team All-CAA honors. As a freshman, he averaged 16 points, 7.4 rebounds and 2.1 assists per game. In his sophomore season, Daly averaged 17.5 points, 6.2 rebounds and 2.4 assists per game and was named to the Third Team All-CAA for his second straight year. Daly missed five games in February 2018 with a sprained ankle. He joined Devon Saddler and Jawan Carter as the only players in school history to reach 1,000 career points in their first two seasons, as he scored exactly 1,000. Following his sophomore season, Daly announced that he would transfer from Delaware.

Saint Joseph's
On April 9, 2018, Daly revealed that he was transferring to Saint Joseph's over offers from Temple and Xavier. He sat out his next season due to National Collegiate Athletic Association transfer rules. On January 11, 2020, Daly recorded 28 points and eight rebounds and made a game-tying circus shot from three-point range to force overtime in an 89–83 loss to Davidson. His shot was ranked number one on SportsCenters Top 10 plays of the day. On February 1, Daly scored a career-high 35 points along with seven rebounds, six assists and three steals in a 78–73 loss to Saint Louis. As a junior, he averaged 20.6 points, 6.9 rebounds, 4.3 assists and 1.2 steals per game. He led the A10 conference in scoring, and led the Hawks in scoring, rebounding and assists. Daly averaged the most points by a Saint Joseph's player since Jameer Nelson in the 2003–04 season. He was named to the Third Team All-Atlantic 10 and First Team All-Big 5. After the season, Daly declared for the 2020 NBA draft, before withdrawing to return to Saint Joseph's for his redshirt senior year. He averaged a team-high18.5 points and 6.0 rebounds per game as a senior.

Professional career
After going undrafted in the 2021 NBA draft, Daly signed with the Chicago Bulls for 2021 NBA Summer League. He was selected with the eighth pick of the second round of the 2021 NBA G League draft by the Motor City Cruise. However, he did not make the opening day roster. On December 21, 2021, Daly signed with the Maine Celtics, but was waived the next day after playing one game, being subsequently claimed off waivers by the Agua Caliente Clippers. On January 11, 2022, Daly was reacquired and then later waived by the Agua Caliente Clippers.
Ryan has since been employed by the University of Albany men's basketball team as an assistant coach as of 2022.
https://ualbanysports.com/sports/mens-basketball/roster/coaches/ryan-daly/2050

Career statistics

College

|-
| style="text-align:left;"| 2016–17
| style="text-align:left;"| Delaware
| 32 || 21 || 33.5 || .425 || .339 || .683 || 7.4 || 2.1 || .8 || .3 || 16.0
|-
| style="text-align:left;"| 2017–18
| style="text-align:left;"| Delaware
| 28 || 28 || 37.5 || .431 || .311 || .635 || 6.2 || 2.4 || 1.2 || .1 || 17.5
|-
| style="text-align:left;"| 2018–19
| style="text-align:left;"| Saint Joseph's
| style="text-align:center;" colspan="11"|  Redshirt
|-
| style="text-align:left;"| 2019–20
| style="text-align:left;"| Saint Joseph's
| 30 || 30 || 34.7 || .424 || .307 || .733 || 6.9 || 4.3 || 1.2 || .4 || 20.5|-
| style="text-align:left;"| 2020–21
| style="text-align:left;"| Saint Joseph's
| 10 || 10 || 35.0 || .425 || .291 || .684 || 6.0 || 2.5 || 1.1 || .4' || 18.5
|- class="sortbottom"
| style="text-align:center;" colspan="2"| Career
| 100 || 89 || 35.1 || .426 || .417 || .888 || 6.8 || 2.9 || 3.1 || .3 || 18.0

Personal life
Daly's father, Brian, played college basketball for Saint Joseph's from 1989 to 1992. He later coached in high school and college and was an assistant coach for Penn State. Daly's grandfather, Jim Boyle, played and served as head coach for Saint Joseph's, being inducted to the school's Basketball Hall of Fame, and was an assistant coach for the Denver Nuggets under Paul Westhead.

References

External links
Saint Joseph's Hawks bio
Delaware Blue Hens bio

Living people
1998 births
American men's basketball players
Shooting guards
Small forwards
Agua Caliente Clippers players
Delaware Fightin' Blue Hens men's basketball players
Maine Celtics players
Saint Joseph's Hawks men's basketball players
Basketball players from Pennsylvania
People from Ardmore, Pennsylvania
Archbishop John Carroll High School alumni